Heartland is an American country music-oriented digital broadcast television network owned by Get After It Media and broadcast out of Chattanooga, Tennessee. Launched on April 16, 2012, the network began as a revival of The Nashville Network (TNN); the original incarnation (now known as Paramount Network) existed as a basic cable and satellite television network from March 7, 1983, to September 24, 2000.

History

On April 16, 2012, Luken Communications (now known as Reach High Media Group) and Jim Owens Entertainment announced a joint venture to relaunch The Nashville Network as a digital broadcast television network on November 1, 2012 with the network to carry much of the original TNN's programming, including Music City Tonight, Crook & Chase, Yesteryear and (in cooperation with the Country Music Hall of Fame) Nashville Now, as well as new and original programming.

In October 2013, the partnership between Jim Owens Entertainment and Luken Communications ended and the network was rebranded as Heartland, carrying much of the same programming and format.

Programming
Programming that aired on the new Nashville Network included shows such as Nashville Now, Crook & Chase, Music City Tonight, The Rick and Bubba Show, and Larry's Country Diner. Much of the same programming continued to air after the rebrand to Heartland. New series added to the network include Rise Up Country with John Ritter, Reflections, Positively Paula (hosted by Paula Deen), the Canadian drama series Heartland, reruns of Canadian sketch comedy The Red Green Show (added September 2018), More Than the Music, The Unseen World, and Morning Beats, a soft news magazine  which replaced Coffee, Country & Cody from WSM Radio in Nashville. Country music videos air when no other programs are scheduled; both contemporary videos and classic country performances are offered, usually presented in blocks by VJs. Coincidentally the network carries the Canadian series Heartland in repeats, with the only connection between the two a shared name.

Heartland's national feed contains no infomercials except for a regularly scheduled presentation brokered by Time-Life Home Video.

Distribution
Heartland is distributed through digital subchannel affiliations. The network is also distributed freely over the Internet; some of the network's programming (including Jim Owens entertainment shows and programming made available online elsewhere behind a paywall) is not available online and is replaced with reruns of programs scheduled at other times. Since 2019, the online feed has operated a full schedule.

As of February 2021, Network affiliates include:

† Any launch dates noted are subject to change.

See also
 Great American Country – former competitor and current home to some former TNN programs.
 RFD-TV – a network launched in 2000, carrying reruns of several shows originally aired on TNN.
 Country Music Television – a similar channel.
 The Country Network – another digital subchannel that exclusively features country music videos.

References

External links
 

American country music
Music video networks in the United States
Television channels and stations established in 2012
Companies based in Nashville, Tennessee